The Bunjako barb (Enteromius magdalenae) is a species of cyprinid fish.

It is found only in Kenya.
Its natural habitats are rivers, swamps, and freshwater lakes. It is not considered a threatened species by the IUCN.

References

Enteromius
Cyprinid fish of Africa
Fish described in 1906
Taxa named by George Albert Boulenger
Taxonomy articles created by Polbot